The Golden Field Guides are a series of larger pocket-sized books that were created by Western Publishing and published under their "Golden Press" line (mostly used for children's books at the time), as a related series to the Golden Guides. Edited by Herbert Zim and Vera Webster, the books were written by experts in their field and illustrated with a simple straightforward style.

Unlike the Golden Guides, the Field Guides went more in-depth, being more aimed at the high school/college level. They also had sturdier covers, obviously intending that they be used in the field. Most note that they are a "Guide to Field Identification" on the cover. To go more in-depth and intended as both identification and educational, most of the Field Guides limited themselves to North America, while the Golden Guides were usually worldwide.

The series, updated, was relaunched in 2001 as "Golden Field Guides by St. Martin's Press". Certain titles have been discontinued, such as the Amphibians of North America and Families of Birds books.

Series list 
 Amphibians of North America, by Hobart Muir Smith (1978) — discontinued by St. Martin's Press
 Birds of North America, by Chandler Robbins and Bertel Bruun (1966)
 Eastern Birds, by James Coe (1994) — limited release in original but continued by St. Martin's Press
 Families of Birds, by Oliver L. Austin (1971) — originally published as a Golden Guide (small format) and later, slightly modified, as Golden Field Guide (large format); later discontinued by St. Martin's Press
 Reptiles of North America, by Hobart Muir Smith, Edmund D. Brodie, David M. Dennis, and Sy Barlowe (1982)
 Minerals of the World, by Charles A. Sorrell (1973) — later renamed Rocks and Minerals
 Seashells of North America, by R. Tucker Abbott (1968)
 Skyguide, by Mark R. Chartrand and Helmut K. Wimmer (1982) — later renamed Night Sky
 Trees of North America, by C. Frank Brockman and Rebecca A. Merrilees (1968)
 Wildflowers of North America, by Frank D. Venning and Manabu C. Saito (1984)

There were some other "Golden Guides" issued but not normally considered part of the regular series.

Associated Series list 
 National Parks of the World, by Kai Curry-Lindahl, Jean-Paul Harroy, and the International Union for Conservation of Nature and Natural Resources (1972) — volumes 1 & 2
 A Golden Guide to Environmental Organizations, by Bruce W. Halstead (1972) 
 The Golden Guide to Lawns, Trees and Shrubs, by John Strohm (1961) 
 The Golden Guide to Flowers A Handbook for Home Gardeners, by John Strohm (1962)

References

External links
 Golden Field Guide from St. Martin's Press

Series of books
Natural history books